Princess Agnes of Anhalt-Dessau (Frederica Amalia Agnes; 24 June 1824 – 23 October 1897) was the eldest daughter of Leopold IV, Duke of Anhalt by his wife Princess Frederica of Prussia. She was a member of the House of Ascania, and by her marriage to Ernst I, Duke of Saxe-Altenburg, Duchess consort of Saxe-Altenburg.

Family
Agnes' father Duke Leopold was a child of Frederick, Hereditary Prince of Anhalt-Dessau by his wife Landgravine Amalie of Hesse-Homburg. Her mother Princess Frederica was the daughter of Prince Louis Charles of Prussia (brother of King Frederick William III of Prussia) by his wife Frederica of Mecklenburg-Strelitz.

Agnes was an older sister of Frederick I, Duke of Anhalt and Maria Anna, Princess Frederick Charles of Prussia. Through Maria Anna, Agnes was an aunt of Elisabeth Anna, Grand Duchess of Oldenburg and Louise Margaret, Duchess of Connaught and Strathearn.

Marriage
On 28 April 1853, Agnes married Ernst of Saxe-Altenburg. He was a son of Georg, Duke of Saxe-Altenburg and Marie Luise of Mecklenburg-Schwerin, and succeeded his father as Duke of Saxe-Altenburg later that year. They had two children:

 Princess Marie Friederike Leopoldine Georgine Auguste Alexandra Elisabeth Therese Josephine Helene Sophie (2 August 1854 – 8 October 1898), married on 19 April 1873 to Prince Albrecht of Prussia.
 Prince Georg Leopold Ernst Joseph Alexander Friedrich Ludwig Johann Albert (1 February 1856 – 29 February 1856).

As their only son died as an infant, the duchy would be inherited by their nephew Ernst upon Ernst I's death in 1908.

Life
Agnes was regarded as a talented painter.

Like many noblewomen of her time, she took an interest in charity, especially in nursing and the care of troops wounded in the Franco-German war.

In 1878 on the 25th anniversary of the couple's marriage, Ernst gave his wife the miniature newly created Knight's Cross First Class of the Saxe-Ernestine House Order, the so-called "Princesses Cross". On the occasion of the anniversary, the Ernst-Agnes-Stiftung (Ernst-Agnes Foundation) was established.

Agnes died on 23 October 1897, at the age of 73. In the city of Altenburg,  Agnesplatz  is named after her. She is buried in the Herzogin-Agnes-Gedächtniskirche (Duchess Agnes Memorial Church).

Author
She was the author of Ein Wort an Israel  ("A Word to Israel") (Leipzig, 1893), a book which dealt with antisemitism and Christianity in Germany. The book, published 1893 in German as Ein Wort an Israel  as no. 37-38 of the academic series Institutum Judaicum zu Leipig. Schriften, was also translated into Italian as Una parola ad Israele.

Ancestry

References

Sources

 Schoeppl, Heinrich Ferdinand: Die Herzoge von Sachsen-Altenburg. Bozen 1917, Neudruck Altenburg 1992.

1824 births
1897 deaths
People from Dessau-Roßlau
House of Ascania
House of Saxe-Altenburg
19th-century German writers
Duchesses of Saxe-Altenburg
19th-century German women writers
Daughters of monarchs